Joseph Francis "Chick" Reiser (December 17, 1914 – July 29, 1996) was an American professional basketball player and coach.

Reiser played college basketball for the NYU Violets and the Pratt Cannoneers. He played professionally in several leagues, including the National Basketball League (NBL), Basketball Association of America (BAA), and National Basketball Association (NBA). Reiser was a member of teams such as the Fort Wayne Zollner Pistons, the Baltimore Bullets, and the Washington Capitols.

From 1951 to 1952, Reiser served as coach of the Baltimore Bullets, compiling an 8–22 record. He was fired by the Bullets on November 12, 1952.

BAA/NBA career statistics

Regular season

Playoffs

References

External links

1914 births
1996 deaths
American men's basketball coaches
American men's basketball players
Basketball coaches from New York (state)
Basketball players from New York City
Baltimore Bullets (1944–1954) draft picks
Baltimore Bullets (1944–1954) head coaches
Baltimore Bullets (1944–1954) players
Fort Wayne Zollner Pistons players
NYU Violets men's basketball players
Pratt Institute alumni
Shooting guards
Small forwards
Washington Capitols players